Chuck Calvert is the Chairman of the Ohio Elections Commission, and a former member of the Ohio House of Representatives, succeeded by Bill Batchelder. Calvert was named as a potential successor to Bob Gibbs, who won election to Congress and vacated his seat in the Ohio Senate late in 2010, but he did not run.

References

1930 births
Members of the Ohio House of Representatives
Living people
21st-century American politicians